Buckeye Township is a township in Ellis County, Kansas, USA.  As of the 2010 census, its population was 414.

Geography
According to the USGS, it contains three cemeteries: Hyacinth, Saint Andrew and Saint Severin.

References
 USGS Geographic Names Information System (GNIS)

External links

 US-Counties.com
 City-Data.com

Townships in Ellis County, Kansas
Townships in Kansas